Coatesville Historic District is a national historic district located in Coatesville, Chester County, Pennsylvania. The district includes 457 contributing buildings in the central business district and surrounding residential areas of the city of Coatesville. The buildings date from the mid-18th century to 1937, with most built between 1850 and 1924.  They are mostly two- and three-story commercial buildings constructed of brick.  They include notable examples of the Gothic and Italianate styles.  Notable buildings include the Fleming House (c. 1750), Brandywine Mansion (c. 1750), National Bank of Chester Valley (1917), St. Cecelia's Church (1870), Beth Israel Synagogue (1925), and Coatesville High School (1915).  The district includes the separately listed Lukens Main Office Building, and "Terracina."

It was added to the National Register of Historic Places in 1987.

References

Historic districts on the National Register of Historic Places in Pennsylvania
Gothic Revival architecture in Pennsylvania
Italianate architecture in Pennsylvania
Historic districts in Chester County, Pennsylvania
Coatesville, Pennsylvania
National Register of Historic Places in Chester County, Pennsylvania